This is a list of some of the best-selling albums in Colombia. Colombia is one of the largest music markets in Latin America. The majority of the albums are from local artists; various artists such as Carlos Vives, Diomedes Díaz, Juancho Rois, Margarita Rosa de Francisco, Juanes and Shakira appear more than once in the list.

List of best-selling albums

Best-selling artists in Colombia
According to some media publications, Diomedes Díaz sold about 20 million copies in Colombia. Mexican singer, Vicente Fernandez is believed to have sold 5 million. Although figures lack of reliability.

See also 
 ASINCOL
 List of best-selling albums by country

References 

Colombia
Colombian music